School District 33 Chilliwack is a school district in the Fraser Valley region of British Columbia, Canada. 
It has an enrollment of approximately 14,000 full and part-time students, and approximately 1,800 teachers and support staff. Its annual budget for the 2021/22 school year is $142,589,226 CAD.

History
The Chilliwack School District was created on June 16, 1870.

James Kennedy was first teacher appointed by the Province of British Columbia in Chilliwack, on June 18, 1872.

Schools

See also
List of school districts in British Columbia
Trustee Barry Neufeld

References

External links
 Directory of schools, services, and people to contact in the Chilliwack School District 2013/14
 District Review Report Mar 14-16, 2005
 History of Chilliwack Schools
 Policy manual
 School boundaries map

Education in Chilliwack
33